is a Japanese actor, voice actor and narrator currently affiliated with Fujiga Office Inc. He is married to fellow voice actress Mayumi Shō.

Filmography

Anime
 Persia, the Magic Fairy (1984) (Gaku Muroi)
 Alpen Rose (1985) (Lundi Cortot)
 High School! Kimengumi (1985) (Shō Kireide)
 Mobile Suit Zeta Gundam (1985) (Katz Kobayashi)
 Touch (1985) (Kazuya Uesugi)
 Machine Robo: Revenge of Cronos (1986) (Koron)
 Hiatari Ryōkō! (1987) (Kodama)
 Kimagure Orange Road (1987) (Seiji Komatsu)
 Dragon Ball Z (1989) (Zeshin)
 Pink: Water Bandit, Rain Bandit (1990) (Cobalt Blue)
 Sailor Moon (1992) (Gurio Umino, Zoisite)

Unknown date
 Captain Tsubasa (Karl Heinz Schneider)
 DNA² (Junta Momonari)
 The Doraemons (Dora the Kid)
 Dragon Quest: Dai no Daibōken (Popp, Mystvearn)
 Fatal Fury: Legend of the Hungry Wolf (1992) (Andy Bogard)
 Fatal Fury 2: The New Battle (1993) (Andy Bogard)
 Fatal Fury: The Motion Picture (1994) (Andy Bogard)
 Hokuto no Ken 2 (Adult Bat)
 Fuuma no Kojirou (Kojirou)
 Futari wa Pretty Cure Splash Star (Moerumba)
 Little Nemo: Adventures in Slumberland (Oomp)
 Locke the Superman (Locke)
 Mobile Suit Gundam Wing (Alex)
 Ninja Ryūkenden (Ryu Hayabusa)
 One Piece (Shepherd, Itomimizu)
 Ranma ½ (Picolet Chardin III)
 Saint Seiya (Pisces Aphrodite, Poseidon/Julian Solo, Tateza Jan, Astaroth, Freyr)
 Saint Seiya: Soul of Gold (Pisces Aphrodite)
 Sakigake!! Otokojuku (Hien)
 Sakura Taisen: Katsudō Shashin (Patrick Hamilton)
 Toriko (Joa)
 Transformers (Blaster, Twincast, Leozak, Leocaesar, White Leo)
 Trigun (Hoppered the Gauntlet)
 Violence Jack: Harlem Bomber (Kenichi)

Video games
 Fatal Fury 3: Road to the Final Victory (Andy Bogard)
 The King of Fighters '95 (Andy Bogard)
 Real Bout Fatal Fury (Andy Bogard) 
 The King of Fighters '96 (Andy Bogard)
 Real Bout Fatal Fury Special (Andy Bogard)
 The King of Fighters '97 (Andy Bogard)
 Real Bout Fatal Fury 2: The Newcomers (Andy Bogard)
 The King of Fighters '98 (Andy Bogard)
 Fatal Fury: Wild Ambition (Andy Bogard)
 The King of Fighters '99 (Andy Bogard)
 The King of Fighters 2000 (Andy Bogard)
 The King of Fighters 2001 (Andy Bogard)
 The King of Fighters 2002 (Andy Bogard)
 The King of Fighters XII (Andy Bogard)
 The King of Fighters XIII (Andy Bogard)
 Guilty Gear Xrd -SIGN- (Axl Low)
 Guilty Gear Xrd -REVELATOR- (Axl Low)
 Guilty Gear -STRIVE- (Axl Low)
Unknown date
 Captain Tsubasa 5: Hasha no Shogo Campione (xxxx) (Karl-Heinz Schneider)
 Black/Matrix (xxxx) (Juda)
 Guilty Gear series (xxxx-xx) (Axl Low)
 Sakura Taisen V Episode 0 Kouya no Samurai Musume (xxxx) (Patrick Hamilton)
 Saint Seiya Senki (xxxx) (Pisces Aphrodite)

Tokusatsu
 Ultraman Mebius (xxxx) (Ultraman Hikari/Hunter Knight Tsurugi, Kodaigon The Other)
 Juken Sentai Gekiranger (xxxx) (Confrontation Beast Eel-Fis Nagiu (ep. 12))
 Ultraman Mebius Gaiden: Ghost Reverse (xxxx) (Ultraman Hikari)
 Mega Monster Battle: Ultra Galaxy (xxxx) (Ultraman Hikari)
 Tokumei Sentai Go-Busters (xxxx) (Rousokuloid (ep. 25))
 Ultra Fight Victory (xxxx) (Ultraman Hikari)
 Ultraman Geed (xxxx) (Ultraman Hikari ep. 8)

Dubbing roles

Live-action
 Avatar: The Way of Water (Parker Selfridge (Giovanni Ribisi))
 A Better Tomorrow II (Sung Tse-kit (Leslie Cheung))

Animation
 6teen (Jude Lizowski)
 The Adventures of Tintin (Rastapopoulos)
 The Legend of Tarzan (Hugo)
 Avengers Assemble (Red Skull)

References

External links
 Official agency profile 
 

1957 births
Living people
Actors from Shimane Prefecture
Actors from Yamaguchi Prefecture
Aoni Production voice actors
Japanese male stage actors
Japanese male video game actors
Japanese male voice actors
Male voice actors from Shimane Prefecture
Male voice actors from Yamaguchi Prefecture
20th-century Japanese male actors
21st-century Japanese male actors